Black in Latin America is a documentary television series that aired on PBS on April 19, 2011, in the United States. The series is based on the 2011 book Black in Latin America by Henry Louis Gates Jr., who produced the four-episode series. Both the documentary and book explore the historical roots and influence of Afro-Latin Americans. The book's chapters and the documentary's episodes each focus on individual Latin American countries whose African heritage is often overlooked. Each nation has varying perceptions of race and color, but all had policies in order to lighten the overall skin color of their population. For example, in 1933 Mexico restricted the immigration of blacks into the country, and 4 million white European immigrants were welcomed to Brazil between 1884 and 1939.

Gates' purpose behind creating the documentary was to make African-American history and present-day experiences better known within the context of Latin America. One fact highlighted by Gates was that Barack Obama was not the first black president of a multi-racial nation, but rather Vicente Guerrero, Mexico's president from April to December in 1829, was the first.

Episodes

Criticism
There have been several critiques of Gates' work on Haiti and the Dominican Republic, including essentialist depictions and misunderstanding of popular cultural forms.

John Maddox and Michael Steinkampf of the University of Alabama wrote in a 2015 Afro-Hispanic Review article that Gates leaves out a lot of information in the second episode, "Cuba: The Next Revolution". The authors suggest that due to the strong control of media, the documentary did not provide sufficient information about racism in Cuba. Gates's book Black in Latin America provides more information on the subject.

References

External links

2011 in American television
2010s American documentary television series
African diaspora history
African diaspora in North America
African diaspora in South America
Immigration to North America
Immigration to South America
Television series by WNET